The Guinea lidless skink (Panaspis  africana) is a species of lidless skinks in the family Scincidae. The species is found on Príncipe, Ilhéu das Rolas, and São Tomé.

References

Panaspis
Reptiles described in 1845
Taxa named by John Edward Gray